is a football (soccer) club based in Tsukuba, which is located in Ibaraki Prefecture in Japan. They play in the Kantō Soccer League, which is part of Japanese Regional Leagues.

History
Tied to University of Tsukuba, the club was initially founded in 1993 as a women's football club. Shortly after that, a men's version of the club was launched. In 2000s, even U-12 and U-15 squad were created and Tsukuba FC have the goal of reaching professional football in 2020. In 2014, the club reached Kanto Soccer League, winning immediately 2nd Division and now trying to reach Japan Football League. Their plans revealed the will to build a stadium for 30,000 people in the near future. Tsukuba FC's main sponsor is Joyful Honda, a hardware store akin to The Home Depot or Lowe's in the United States and unrelated to Honda Motor Company.

Current squad
Updated to 14 October 2022.

League record

References

External links
Official Site 
Official Facebook Page
Official Twitter Account

Football clubs in Japan
Sports teams in Ibaraki Prefecture
Tsukuba, Ibaraki
Association football clubs established in 1993
1993 establishments in Japan